Melaleuca chisholmii commonly known as Burra bottlebrush is a plant in the myrtle family, Myrtaceae and is endemic to  Queensland. It is a shrub with rough bark, an open habit and spiky foliage but in winter has bright red flower spikes tipped with yellow.

Description

The flowers are arranged in spikes on the ends of branches that continue to grow after flowering. There are 25 to 57 stamens in each flower, with red filaments red yellow anthers.

Taxonomy and naming
Burra bottlebrush was first formally described in 1925 by Edwin Cheel, who gave it the name Callistemon chisholmii in the Proceedings of the Linnean Society of New South Wales from a specimen collected on the "western watershed, Thompson River Fall, North Queensland". In 2006 Lyndley Craven changed the name to Melaleuca chisholmii in the journal Novon. (Cheel gave the incorrect spelling Callistemon chisholmi.) The specific epithet (chisholmii) honours J.R. Chisholm (1855-1927), a botanical collector who collected the type specimen of this species.

Some Australian state herbaria continue to use the name Callistemon chisholmii, but Melaleuca chisholmii is the accepted name in Queensland. Callistemon chisholmii is regarded as a synonym of Melaleuca chisholmii by the Royal Botanic Gardens, Kew.

Distribution and habitat
This melaleuca occurs in higher areas of central Queensland in woodland and forest near watercourses.

Conservation status
Burra bottlebrush is listed as of "least concern" under the Queensland Government Nature Conservation Act 1992.

Use in horticulture
Melaleuca chisholmii is a hardy plant from dry inland areas but has been grown successfully in Townsville.

References

chisholmii
Flora of Queensland
Plants described in 1925
Taxa named by Edwin Cheel